Testosterone enantate benzilic acid hydrazone (TEBH), or testosterone 17β-enantate 3-benzilic acid hydrazone, is a synthetic, injected androgen/anabolic steroid and an androgen ester – specifically, the C17β enantate (heptanoate) ester and C3 benzilic acid hydrazone of testosterone. It was previously marketed in combination with estradiol benzoate and estradiol dienantate under the brand names Climacteron, Lactimex, and Lactostat. Clinical studies have assessed this formulation. TEBH was first described in the scientific literature in 1959. It is a very long-lasting prodrug of testosterone when administered in oil via intramuscular injection.

Chemistry
Chemical synthesis of TEBH has been described.

See also
 List of androgen esters § Testosterone esters
 Hydroxyprogesterone heptanoate benzilic acid hydrazone

References

Abandoned drugs
Androgens and anabolic steroids
Androstanes
Benzilic acid hydrazone esters
Enanthate esters
Ketones
Prodrugs
Testosterone esters